Emerge is a carbonated mixed-fruit flavour energy drink from the United Kingdom which contains taurine and caffeine. It is produced by the Cott Corporation at their packaging facility at Kegworth in Leicestershire. It is sold in Tesco, Asda, Poundland, Home Bargains and other retailers.
 Its primary difference from competing brand-name energy drinks such as Red Bull and Relentless is the comparatively lower RRP of 59p (250ml can). It can often be found at a lower price than this (for example in pound shops) often undercutting supermarket store brands.

The brand is the sixth largest in the UK, after Lucozade, Red Bull, Monster, Relentless and Rockstar.

In 2014, 15.1 million litres of the drink was produced, an increase of 24.3% on the previous year.

Ingredients
Listed below is the ingredients for the regular version:
Carbonated water
Sugar
Sweets
Citric acid
Taurine (0.3%)
Glucuronolactone (0.24%) (Not in the 1litre bottle)
Flavouring (including Caffeine (0.03%))
Acidity regulator (Sodium Citrates)
Inositol
Colours (Sulfite, Ammonia caramel, Carmoisine)
Vitamins (Niacin, B5, B6, B2, B12)
Preservative (Sodium Benzoate)

Not recommended for people who may be sensitive to caffeine, or for pregnant women or children.

All versions of Emerge are suitable for vegetarians and vegans.

Available in 250 and 330ml cans, 500ml and 1l plastic bottles. Also non sparkling, isotonic drinks in 2 flavours (orange and mixed berry) available in 500ml plastic bottles.

Flavours
Two new flavours of Emerge were released in 2011, the Mixed Berry flavour and the Tropical flavour. Listed below are the flavours: In 2021 more flavours were added including Zero White and Impact.

Sponsorship
Emerge sponsored NME's 2011 Emerge Radar 2011 Tour.

References

External links

emergestimulation.com Official Website

Energy drinks